Samuel Carr was an American politician, soldier, and planter who served in the Maryland House of Delegates, the Virginia House of Delegates, and the Virginia Senate. He is best known as a player in the Jefferson-Hemings controversy as he, alongside his brother Peter, was at one time rumored to have fathered children by Sally Hemings.

Personal life
Carr was born on October 9, 1771, at Spring Forest, a plantation in Goochland County, Virginia, the son of Virginia politician, planter, and lawyer Dabney Carr and Martha Jefferson Carr. Martha was the sister of Thomas Jefferson, and therefore Samuel Carr was Jefferson's nephew. His father died when Carr was less than two years old, and for a time his mother attempted to continue raising her children at Spring Forest, but by 1781 the family had moved to Monticello, Jefferson's plantation. Jefferson was an executor of Dabney Carr's estate, and arranged for a Maryland relative, Overton Carr, to guide Samuel's education. Thus Samuel moved to Prince George's County, Maryland, where he met and married his first wife (and first cousin), Ellen Boucher Carr. Jefferson also helped to secure the promised inheritance of a nearby plantation, Dunlora, which had been promised to Samuel by another uncle at his birth. After securing Dunlora, Carr moved back to Virginia to establish a household with his wife and his mother.

Carr would have four children with Ellen, before a prolonged illness took her life in July, 1815, leaving Samuel a widower. During the interval before he remarried, Carr may have fathered at least one child, and perhaps two children, with a free woman of color named Judath Barnett who lived near Dunlora. Two of Barnett's children, Miles and Zachariah, later changed their last name to Carr, and Samuel helped secure an apprenticeship for Miles, although at no point did he publicly acknowledge that either of the boys were his. In December 1818, Samuel remarried, taking a much younger Maria Watson Dabney as his wife, with whom he would have one more child. Over the next decade, he rebuilt the plantation house at Dunlora, in part using brick leftover from the construction of the main buildings at the University of Virginia. He continued to expand plantation operations, and by 1830 he owned 44 slaves.

By the mid-1840s, Carr had deeded all his property to his children. He eventually moved closer to his eldest son in Kanawha County in the western reaches of Virginia, which would soon separate to form West Virginia. Carr died on July 26, 1855, in Charleston, later the capital of West Virginia, at age 83.

Career
Carr served, from 1792 to 1802, as Captain of Cavalry in Albemarle County's First Battalion, 47th Regiment. During the War of 1812, he again served a Captain of Cavalry, this time with the Albemarle Volunteers, First Elite Corps, under Colonel Thomas Mann Randolph, his second cousin once removed. This unit's mission was to defend Norfolk, but they saw little, if any, action. Carr was discharged in Richmond on September 20, 1814.

Carr served in the Maryland House of Delegates during the 1801–1802 and 1802–1803 terms, representing Prince George's County, Maryland, before his return in 1803 to Virginia. He later served in both the Virginia House of Delegates and the Virginia Senate, and as a magistrate for Albemarle County, Virginia.

Jefferson-Hemings controversy

In 1802 journalist James Thomson Callender claimed that Thomas Jefferson had fathered children with one of his slaves, Sally Hemings. These claims were given credence due to several factors such as Jefferson's presence at Monticello during the time periods that the children were conceived and the lack of pregnancies when he was not present. Theories that Carr and his brother Peter could have fathered the children surfaced in the mid-1800s due to secondhand accounts where Thomas Jefferson Randolph claimed that Peter and Samuel Carr were responsible. These claims are still given credence by some scholars, even though DNA tests in  1998 ruled that the Carrs could not have fathered one of Hemings's children, Eston.

References

1771 births
1855 deaths
Members of the Virginia House of Delegates
Members of the Maryland House of Delegates
Virginia state senators
People from Goochland County, Virginia
People from Prince George's County, Maryland
People from Kanawha County, West Virginia
People from Monticello
Virginia colonial people
Burials at Monticello